USCGC Sea Dragon (WPB-87367) is a  cutter, that is assigned to one of two special Maritime Force Protection Units.  Each unit is assigned to escort nuclear submarines from one the United States Navy's two main submarine bases.  Sea Dragon was assigned to Naval Submarine Base Kings Bay.

Sea Dragon was commissioned in January 2008.  She was joined by a sister ship, in May, 2009.  The unit included an assortment of smaller Coast Guard boats.  A similar unit escorts submarines near Bangor, Washington.

Design

All the cutters carry a water-jet propelled fast pursuit boat. The boats can be launched or retrieved without bringing the mothership to a complete halt. The standard Marine Protector is armed with a pair of fifty caliber Browning M2 machine gun, that mount on pintles, on the port and starboard rail of the foredeck. But for Sea Dragon, and the other three vessels ordered for the Navy, a third machine gun was added, mounted on a pedestal, in the middle of the foredeck. The third machine gun is equipped with advanced optics, is gyro stabilized, and its gunner uses remote controls - making it much more accurate, at long range, when fired from a heaving deck, at night, or in a fog.

References

Marine Protector-class coastal patrol boats
Patrol vessels of the United States
Ships built in Lockport, Louisiana
Ships of the United States Coast Guard
2008 ships